The 2006 GFS Marketplace 400 was a NASCAR Nextel Cup Series stock car race held on August 20, 2006, at Michigan International Speedway in Brooklyn, Michigan. Contested over 200 laps on a  speedway, it was the 23rd race of the 2006 NASCAR Nextel Cup Series season. Matt Kenseth of Roush Racing won the race.

Background
The track is used primarily for NASCAR events. It is sometimes known as a "sister track" to Texas World Speedway, and was used as the basis of Auto Club Speedway. The track is owned by International Speedway Corporation (ISC). Michigan International Speedway is recognized as one of motorsports' premier facilities because of its wide racing surface and high banking (by open-wheel standards; the 18-degree banking is modest by stock car standards).

Entry list

Qualifying

Results

Race Statistics
 Time of race: 2:57:39
 Average Speed: 
 Pole Speed: 
 Cautions: 10 for 36 laps
 Margin of Victory: 0.622 sec
 Lead changes: 26
 Percent of race run under caution: 18%         
 Average green flag run: 14.9 laps

References 

GFS Marketplace 400
GFS Marketplace 400
NASCAR races at Michigan International Speedway
GFS Marketplace 400